Ostriv (Ukrainian for "island") may refer to:

Places

Ukraine
 Chernihiv Oblast
 Ostriv, Nizhyn Raion

 Ivano-Frankivsk Oblast
 Ostriv, Ivano-Frankivsk Raion

 Khmelnytskyi Oblast
 Chornyi Ostriv (Khmelnytskyi Oblast), Khmelnytskyi Raion

 Kyiv Oblast
 Ostriv, Bila Tserkva Raion

 Lviv Oblast
 Ostriv, Chervonohrad Raion
 Ostriv, Sambir Raion
 Ostriv, Stryi Raion
 Ostriv, Zolochiv Raion, Lviv Oblast
 Chornyi Ostriv (Lviv Oblast), Zhydachiv Raion

 Riven Oblast
 Ostriv, Volodymyrets Raion
 Ostriv, Dubno Raion
 Ostriv, Radyvyliv Raion

 Ternopil Oblast
 Ostriv, Ternopil Raion

 Volyn Oblast
 Ostriv, Kivertsivskyi Raion

 Zhytomyr Oblast
 Ostriv, Ovruch Raion

See also
Ostrov (disambiguation)
Ostrów (disambiguation) (Polish form)
Ostrowo (disambiguation)
Ostrowiec (disambiguation)
Ostrau (disambiguation) (German form)